Mishu-e Jonubi Rural District is in Sufian District of Shabestar County, East Azerbaijan province, Iran. At the National Census of 2006, its population was 10,276 in 2,621 households. There were 8,563 inhabitants in 2,503 households at the following census of 2011. At the most recent census of 2016, the population of the rural district was 8,648 in 2,881 households. The largest of its 10 villages was Nazarlu, with 3,773 people.

References 

Shabestar County

Rural Districts of East Azerbaijan Province

Populated places in East Azerbaijan Province

Populated places in Shabestar County